Goolsby is a surname. Notable people with the surname include:

Mike Goolsby (born 1982), American football player
Ray Goolsby (1919–1999), baseball player 
Tony Goolsby (born 1933), a businessman and former member of the Texas House of Representatives
Katherine Goolsby (born 1981), American speech language pathologist and expert on beagles.

Fictional characters
Dustin Goolsby, a character on the American television program Glee